Oksana Bushevitsa (born 20 July 1973) is a former Latvian female tennis player.

She is a member of the Latvia Fed Cup team and has a win-loss record in the Fed Cup of 10–9.

ITF Circuit finals

Singles (1–2)

References

External links
 
 

1973 births
Living people
Latvian female tennis players
Soviet female tennis players